Dave Stone (born 12 June 1964) is a British science fiction writer.

Biography

Stone has written many spin off novels based on the BBC science fiction television series Doctor Who and Judge Dredd.

Stone also contributed a number of comic series appearing in 2000 AD and in the Judge Dredd Megazine, focusing on the Judge Dredd universe.  In collaboration with David Bishop and artist Shaky Kane he produced the much disliked Soul Sisters, which he has described as "a joke-trip, which through various degrees of miscommunication ended up as a joke-strip without any jokes."  Working independently, he created the better received Armitage, a take on Inspector Morse set in a future London, and also contributed to the ongoing Judge Hershey series.

Bibliography

Comics
Comics work includes:

Armitage:
 "Armitage" (with Sean Phillips, in Judge Dredd Megazine #1.09-14, 1991)
 "The Case of the Detonating Dowager" (with Sean Phillips, in Judge Dredd Yearbook 1993, 1992)
 "Influential Circles" (with Charlie Adlard, in Judge Dredd Megazine #2 10-2.18, 1992)
 "Flashback" (with Charlie Adlard, in Judge Dredd Megazine #2 19-2.21, 1993)
 "Flashback II" (with Charlie Adlard, in Judge Dredd Megazine #2.31-2.33, 1993)
 "City of the Dead Prologue" (with Peter Doherty, in Judge Dredd Megazine #2.63, 1994)
 "City of the Dead" (with Charles Gillespie, in Judge Dredd Megazine #2.64-2.71, 1994–1995)
 "Little Assassins" (with Adrian Salmon, in Judge Dredd Mega Special 1996)
 "Bodies of Evidence" (with Steve Yeowell, in Judge Dredd Megazine #3.64-67, 2000)
 "Apostasy in the UK" (with John Ridgway, in Judge Dredd Megazine #212-213, 2003)
 "Dumb Blond" (with John Cooper, in Judge Dredd Megazine #266-270, 2008)
 "The Mancunian Candidate" (with John Cooper, in Judge Dredd Megazine #285-290, 2009)
 "The Unpleasantness at the Tontine Club" (with John Cooper, in Judge Dredd Megazine #300-301, 2010)
 "Underground" (with Patrick Goddard, in Judge Dredd Megazine #318-321, 2012)
 Strange Cases: "Demonspawn" (with Kev Hopgood, in Judge Dredd Yearbook 1992, September 1991)
Soul Sisters (with Shaky Kane):
 "Soul Sisters" (co-written with David Bishop, in Judge Dredd Megazine #2.02-2.09, 1992)
 "Untitled" (in Judge Dredd Yearbook 1993, 1992)
Judge Hershey: "Down Time" (with Paul Peart, in Judge Dredd Megazine #2.09, 1992)
Hershey & Steel: "Degenomancer" (with Charlie Adlard, in Judge Dredd Megazine #2.35-2.36, 1993)
Tracer (with Paul Peart, in 2000 AD #948-949, 1995)

Novels

Judge Dredd
Deathmasques (1993)
The Medusa Seed (1994)
Wetworks (1995)
Psykogeddon (2006)

Virgin New Adventures
Sky Pirates! (1995)
Death and Diplomacy (1996)
Ship of Fools (1997)
Oblivion (1998)
The Mary-Sue Extrusion (1998)
Return to the Fractured Planet (1999)

Virgin Missing Adventures
Burning Heart (1996)

Past Doctor Adventures
Heart of TARDIS (2000)

Eighth Doctor Adventures
The Slow Empire (2001)

Telos Doctor Who novellas
Citadel of Dreams (2002)

Bernice Summerfield
The Infernal Nexus (2001)
The Two Jasons (2007)

Other
Golgotha Run (Dark Future) (2005)

Audio plays

Bernice Summerfield
The Green-Eyed Monsters (2002)
The Worst Thing in the World (2006)
The End of the World (2007)

References

 
 
 
 Dave Stone at 2000 AD online

External links
Dave Stone's home page

Living people
1964 births
20th-century English novelists
21st-century British novelists
English science fiction writers
English comics writers
Writers of Doctor Who novels